Van Haeften is a surname. Notable people with the surname include: 

Benedictus van Haeften (1588–1648), provost of Affligem Abbey and writer of religious works
Johnny Van Haeften (born 1952), British art dealer
Lex van Haeften (born 1987), Dutch footballer